Electrical grid security in the United States involves the physical and cybersecurity of the United States electrical grid.

From the 2000s through to the 2020s, the security of the U.S. electrical grid has come into question. Government officials have expressed concern with the possibility of violent extremists and agents of foreign states attacking the nation's electrical grid. Cybersecurity is also an issue for electric grid security in the United States with financially motivated crimes being more common than terrorist ones.

Overview 
In the 2010s and 2020s, attacks to the United States electrical grid have become more frequent, with 2022 being the year with the most attacks. Since 2014, vandalism and confirmed or suspected physical attacks on electrical grid infrastructure have also been the second-largest cause of electrical disturbance events.

In 2012, the National Research Council of the National Academies of Sciences, Engineering, and Medicine published a declassified report prepared in 2007 for the Department of Homeland Security that highlighted the vulnerability of the national electric grid from damage to high voltage transformers.

In October 2022, the FBI published a report that described an increase in reported threats to critical infrastructure from people who espouse "racially or ethnically motivated violent extremist ideology", with an aim of creating civil disorder and inspiring further violence.

In a report concerning extremist threats, the Department of Homeland Security made note of a Telegram document that gave instructions for low-tech sabotage, including attacks on electrical power stations with rifles. The document circulated among online white nationalist communities, which advocate the toppling of the U.S. government.

The threat of potential electrical grid cyberattacks by foreign states such as Russia has also been area of concern for electrical grid security.

Incidents

1975

California 
In March and April of 1975, a "closely guarded" Pacific Gas and Electric substation was bombed twice in two separate incidents, knocking out power to more than 22,000 customers. The New World Liberation Front (NWLF) took credit for these attacks.

Washington  
On 31 December 1975, an electrical substation in Seattle, Washington was bombed by the George Jackson Brigade.

2013

Arkansas 
Multiple attacks on electrical infrastructure were carried out by Jason Woodring in Central Arkansas between August and October 2013. Woodring attacked power lines and an electrical tower near Cabot, a switching station in Scott, and power lines and poles in Jacksonville.

Metcalf, California

2016

Utah 
In 2016 a Utah man attacked a substation with a rifle. He was convicted and sentenced to federal prison. Court document indicated that he had planned to attack other stations as well.

2022

Jones County, NC
On November 11, 2022, an electrical distribution substation belonging to Carteret-Craven Electric Cooperative in North Carolina was damaged by vandals. The damage resulted in the loss of electrical power to more than 12,000 residents.

Washington and Oregon 
At least six attacks were carried out against electrical infrastructure in the Pacific Northwest in late November, 2022. Two of the incidents involved firearms.

Moore County, NC

Pierce County, WA 
Four power substations in the Tacoma, Washington area were vandalized on the morning of December 25, 2022. At one point, over 14,000 were without power. The damage has been estimated at $3 million to repair, and is expected to take up to three years to complete.

Two men with previous criminal records of thefts were arrested on January 3, with the reported motive being to cut the power to serve as part of a wider plan to burglarize several businesses in the area.

References

Attacks on electrical infrastructure in the United States
Acts of sabotage
Power outages in the United States
Unsolved crimes in the United States